We the Common is an album by alternative folk band Thao & the Get Down Stay Down. It was released on February 5, 2013 on the Ribbon Music label.

Produced by John Congleton, the album features a guest appearances from Joanna Newsom on "Kindness Be Conceived".

Background
After the 2009 album Know Better Learn Faster, Thao Nguyen took a break from touring and recording, and volunteered with local outreach projects in her new home of San Francisco. One of these projects was the California Coalition for Women Prisoners, an organization that advocates for healthcare and medical care. During these prison visits she met several women who were serving long sentences – one of them being Valerie Bolden who inspired the album's title track. Nguyen considers this outreach work as a major influence on her music and stated that it had "emotionally shaped" much of We the Common.

Nguyen stated of the album: "My intention from the beginning was to make an album full of songs that better captured the energy and hope and optimism of the collective and of one person in particular—myself—who wanted to be a part of that collective, and one who wanted to be more present in her own life and the lives of those she loved."

Composition and recording
Valerie Bolden, who is currently serving a life sentence without parole for killing her abuser in self-defense, was the inspiration for the album's title track and the lyrics "All they wanted was a villain, a villain, and all they had was me." At the time of the album's release, Bolden has been incarcerated for seventeen years and has not seen her children in twelve years.

The song “City” was written as a tribute to Nguyen’s activist friends at the beginning of the Occupy movement. Nguyen explained in an interview with Mother Jones, “We were on tour at the time so I could check out these burgeoning hubs of activity, and we came home and I thought, ‘If I lay still through this, shame if I sleep tonight.’" 

The song “Kindness Be Conceived,” featuring Joanna Newsom, had been written a month before Nguyen had met Newsom. "I wanted more of that old-time feel in the vocal harmonies.  So when we met I shyly asked if she would demo.  She did an amazing job, I’m so glad and grateful to have her on the record," explained Nguyen. The two had met at a songwriters' retreat at Hedgenrook.

Promotion
To publicize the album, a series of short films were released, directed by Nguyen and Lauren Tabak. The short films included appearances by Ira Glass, John Hodgman and Merill Garbus of Tune-Yards.

Reception

The album received a largely positive critical reception. The SF Weekly described it as "socially conscious and brave, but...also a delight to listen to". PopMatters described it as having a "big-tent sound", with Arnold Pan stating "the way We the Common gets across its open-minded, open-hearted attitude is a real triumph". Allmusic gave the album a four star rating, with Fred Thomas commenting on the broader lyrical focus compared to earlier work, and viewing it as Nguyen's "most mature work and coincidentally some of her most enjoyable". The NMEs Kevin Perry scored it 6/10, stating that there was "something sunkissed and wholesome" about it. Pitchfork Media's Lindsay Zoladz gave it 7.5 out of 10, calling it her "most sharply written record to date".

Track listing

Personnel
Thao and the Get Down Stay Down
Charlie Glenn – guitar, harpsichord
Thao Nguyen – banjo, composer, guitar, handclapping, mandolin, piano, vocals
Adam Thompson – bass guitar, synthesizer, vocal arrangement, vocals

Additional musicians
Paul Alexander – bass
Jesse Cafiero – standup bass
Ralph Carney – horn
Kacey Johansing – vocals
Darren Johnston – trumpet
Jessie Ivry – cello
Eric Kuhn – guitar
Dina Maccabee – violin
Andrew Maguire – percussion, vibraphone
Joanna Newsom – harp, vocals
Emily Ritz – vocals
Rob Shelton – organ, piano
Jason Slota – drums
McKenzie Smith – drums
Chad Stockslager – keyboards
Mirah Yom Tov Zeitlyn – vocals

Technical personnel
Robb Carmichael – package design
John Congleton – engineer, mixing, producer
Alan Douches – mastering
Sergei Mikhailovich Prokudin-Gorskii – photography
Jean Swetchine – photo courtesy

References

External links
 Thao Nguyen official website

Thao & the Get Down Stay Down albums
2013 albums
Ribbon Music albums
Albums produced by John Congleton